Valentine Browne, 2nd Earl of Kenmare PC (I) (15 January 1788 – 31 October 1853), styled Viscount Castlerosse from 1801 to 1812, was Earl of Kenmare and Lord Lieutenant of Kerry. He succeeded Valentine Browne, 1st Earl of Kenmare.

In 1831, he was appointed Lord Lieutenant of Kerry and was made a member of the Privy Council of Ireland in 1834.

References

1788 births
1853 deaths
Lord-Lieutenants of Kerry
Members of the Privy Council of Ireland
Kenmare, Valentine Browne, 6th Viscount
2
Valentine
Peers of the United Kingdom created by Queen Victoria